Sri Ramana Ashram, also known as Sri Ramanasramam, is the ashram which was home to modern sage and Advaita Vedanta master Ramana Maharshi from 1922 until his death in 1950. It is situated at the foot of the Arunachala hill, to the west of Tiruvannamalai, Tamil Nadu, where thousands of seekers flocked to be in his presence. His samadhi shrine continues to attract devotees from all over the world.

History

The ashram gradually grew in its present location after Ramana Maharshi settled near the Samadhi shrine of his mother Alagammal, who died on 19 May 1922. In the beginning, a single small hut was built there. By 1924 two huts were set up, one opposite the samadhi and the other to the north.

Amongst its early western visitors was British writer Paul Brunton in 1931, who is credited with introducing Ramana Maharshi to the West through his books "A Search in Secret India" (1934) and "The Secret Path".  Writer W. Somerset Maugham visited the ashram in 1938, and later used Ramana Maharshi as the model for the holy man, Shri Ganesha in his novel, The Razor’s Edge (1944). Other visitors included Swami Sivananda, Paramahansa Yogananda, Alfred Sorensen (Sunyata) and Wei Wu Wei. 

Arthur Osborne stayed at the Ashram for twenty years, and edited the Ashram's journal, The Mountain Path, besides writing several book on Ramana Maharshi and his teachings. Mouni Sadhu spent several months at the Ashram in 1949. David Godman came to the ashram in 1976, and has since written or edited fourteen books on topics related to Sri Ramana Maharshi. He continues to live near the ashram.

Niranjananda Swami, younger brother of Ramana Maharshi, who had moved to the ashram along with his mother in 1916, stayed at the ashram for the rest of his life and handling its management. His son and grandson have looked after the ashram in turn.

Gallery

See also

 Ramana Maharshi
 Arunachala
 Tiruvannamalai
 Ashram

Notes

References
 
 
Self-Realization: The Life and Teachings of Bhagavan Sri Ramana Maharshi, by B.V. Narasimha Swami
 
 
  online text

Further reading
 My life at Sri Ramanasramam, by Suri Nagamma. Pub. Sri Ramanasramam, 1975.

External links

A Day in the Life at Ramana Maharshi Ashram
Sri Ramanasramam, Official website
Sri Ramana Ashram on the map
Sri Rudram Namakam chamakam chanting Live Video from Sri Ramana Ashram
Ramana Maharshi Upadesa Saram Chanting Live

Religious organisations based in India
Ashrams
Hindu new religious movements
Tiruvannamalai district
Religious organizations established in 1922
Advaita Vedanta